WCCF may refer to:

 WCCF (AM), a radio station in Punta Gorda, Florida, United States
 World Club Champion Football, a Japanese collectible card game and arcade fantasy soccer game
 West Coast Computer Faire, a former annual computer industry conference